Poplar Grove is an unincorporated community in Howard County, Indiana, in the United States.

History
Poplar Grove was laid out in 1846. It was named for a large grove of trees at the original town site.

References

Unincorporated communities in Howard County, Indiana
Unincorporated communities in Indiana